Ernst Stocker (28 October 1905 – 13 February 1976), better known as Coghuf, was a Swiss painter.

References

1905 births
1976 deaths
20th-century Swiss male artists
20th-century Swiss painters
Swiss male painters
Swiss stained glass artists and manufacturers